Charles Boberg is an academic specializing in sociolinguistics, particularly North American English. He is an associate professor of linguistics at McGill University in Montreal.

He studied at the University of Pennsylvania under William Labov, and later collaborated with him and Sharon Ash in the preparation of The Atlas of North American English, published by De Gruyter in 2006. Boberg has been consulted on matters of national security because of his expertise in identifying regional dialects and vocabulary patterns of North American English.

Books 

 William Labov, Sharon Ash, Charles Boberg (2006).The Atlas of North American English: Phonetics, Phonology and Sound Change. Berlin; New York: Mouton de Gruyter.
 Charles Boberg (2010). The English Language in Canada: Status, History and Comparative Analysis. Cambridge: Cambridge University Press.

References

External links 
 Interactive online version of the Atlas of North American English at de Gruyter Mouton

Year of birth missing (living people)
Living people
Linguists from Canada
Academic staff of McGill University
University of Pennsylvania alumni
Place of birth missing (living people)
Sociolinguists